Muppet Babies (also known as Jim Henson's Muppet Babies) is an American animated television series, produced by Jim Henson Productions and Marvel Productions, that aired from September 15, 1984, to November 2, 1991, on CBS.

Series overview

Episodes

Season 1 (1984)

Season 2 (1985)

Season 3 (1986)

Season 4 (1987–88)

Season 5 (1988)

Season 6 (1989–90)

Season 7 (1990)

Season 8 (1991)

References

External links 
 

The Muppets television series
Lists of American children's animated television series episodes